The 1990 Clemson Tigers football team represented Clemson University during the 1990 NCAA Division I-A football season. Clemson's 500th win came October 27 against Wake Forest.

Schedule

References

Clemson
Clemson Tigers football seasons
ReliaQuest Bowl champion seasons
Clemson Tigers football